In phonetics and phonology, a velar stop is a type of consonantal sound, made with the back of the tongue in contact with the soft palate (also known as the velum, hence velar), held tightly enough to block the passage of air (hence a stop consonant). More generally, several kinds are distinguished:

 , voiceless velar plosive
 , voiced velar plosive
 , voiced velar nasal
 , voiceless velar nasal
 , velar ejective
 , voiced velar implosive (rare)

Velar consonants
Plosives